Herminiocala pallidoides is a moth of the family Noctuidae first described by Robert W. Poole in 1989. It is found in Costa Rica.

References

Catocalinae